Robert James "Bob" Briggs (April 28, 1945May 5, 1997) was an American football defensive lineman who played in the American Football League and the National Football League. He played seven seasons for the San Diego Chargers, Cleveland Browns, and Kansas City Chiefs.

See also
 Other American Football League players

References

1945 births
1997 deaths
American football defensive linemen
Heidelberg Student Princes football players
San Diego Chargers players
Cleveland Browns players
Kansas City Chiefs players
Sportspeople from Toledo, Ohio
Players of American football from Ohio
American Football League players